= OR1F2 =

Pseudogene in the species Homo sapiens

OR1F2P

Identifiers
- Aliases: OR1F2P, OLFMF2, OR16-3, OR1F11, OR1F2, OR1F3P, hg91, olfactory receptor family 1 subfamily F member 2 pseudogene
- External IDs: GeneCards: OR1F2P

Gene location (Human)
Chr.	Chromosome 16 (human)
Band	16p13.3	Start	3,215,611 bp
Band	16p13.3	End	3,216,543 bp
Orthologs
Databases	NCBI: entry; OMA: entry
Species	Human	Mouse
Entrez	26184	n/a
Ensembl	ENSG00000203581	n/a
UniProt	n a	n/a
RefSeq (mRNA)	n/a	n/a
RefSeq (protein)	n/a	n/a
Location (UCSC)	Chr 16: 3.22 – 3.22 Mb	n/a
PubMed search		n/a
- Wikidata
View/Edit Human

Olfactory receptor 1F2 is a protein that in humans is encoded by the OR1F2P gene.

Olfactory receptors interact with odorant molecules in the nose, to initiate a neuronal response that triggers the perception of a smell. The olfactory receptor proteins are members of a large family of G-protein-coupled receptors (GPCR) arising from single coding-exon genes. Olfactory receptors share a 7-transmembrane domain structure with many neurotransmitter and hormone receptors and are responsible for the recognition and G protein-mediated transduction of odorant signals. The olfactory receptor gene family is the largest in the genome. The nomenclature assigned to the olfactory receptor genes and proteins for this organism is independent of other organisms.

== See also ==
- Olfactory receptor
